Campo San Martino is a comune (municipality) in the Province of Padua in the Italian region Veneto, located about  northwest of Venice and about  north of Padua. 
 
Campo San Martino borders the following municipalities: Curtarolo, Piazzola sul Brenta, San Giorgio delle Pertiche, San Giorgio in Bosco, Santa Giustina in Colle, Villa del Conte.

References

Cities and towns in Veneto